The 2014 European Parliament election in Bulgaria was held on 25 May 2014 to elect the Members of the European Parliament from Bulgaria to the European Parliament as part of the larger European Parliament election. After a decision by the European Council in 2013, Bulgaria was allocated 17 seats in the European Parliament for the Eighth European Parliament.

The election campaign officially began on 25 April 2014, one month before the election day.

Background 
The elections come a year after the 2013 parliamentary elections in Bulgaria that resulted in a minority parliament. Since the election winner, GERB, failed to form a government the Socialists and the DPS formed a coalition government led by Plamen Oresharski. The European elections of 2014 are considered to be of importance as they will reflect the popularity of the current government.

Changes in electoral law 
In February 2014 Bulgarian MPs voted to lower the preferential-vote threshold for the election from 6% to 5% of each list's total votes.

Implicit electoral threshold still remains equal to the Hare Quota, which is about 5.88% of the total valid votes.

Opinion polls 
Polls include Bulgarian parliamentary election polls if European parliamentary election polling numbers are unavailable.

Pre election campaign

Election campaign

Exit polls

Results

Elected MEPs 

The following 17 MEP were elected:

European People's Party–European Democrats – 7 seats:
 GERB – 6 seats
 Tomislav Donchev (former Minister of European Funding management)
 Andrey Kovatchev (second term as MEP)
 Maria Gabriel (second term as MEP)
 Vladimir Uruchev (third term as MEP)
 Eva Paunova
 Emil Radev
 RB Reformist Bloc – 1 seat
 Svetoslav Malinov (second term as MEP) (according to preliminary info a majority of the voters have expressed their preference for the second candidate in the list – Malinov. Confirmed by the Central Electoral Commission)

Party of European Socialists – 4 seats:
 BSP Bulgarian Socialist Party – 4 seats
 Momchil Nekov (Candidate No. 15 on the party list, but finished in first place after a surprising preference voting victory)
 Sergei Stanishev
 Iliana Yotova (third term as MEP)
 Georgi Pirinski

Alliance of Liberals and Democrats for Europe – 4 seats:
 DPS Movement for Rights and Freedoms – 4 seats:
 Filiz Husmenova (third term as MEP)
 Nedjmi Ali
 Ilhan Kyuchuk
 Iskra Mihaylova (incumbent Minister of Environment and Water Resources, instead of Delyan Peevski)
Declined:
 Delyan Peevski (steps down, turns over his seat to the fifth on the list)

European Conservatives and Reformists – 2 seats
 BBT Bulgaria Without Censorship (Electoral Alliance) – 2 seats
 Nikolay Barekov (Bulgaria Without Censorship)
 Angel Dzhambazki (IMRO – Bulgarian National Movement)

Media expenses 
According to a survey taken by the NGO Institute for Public Environment Development, the following table represents the media campaign expenses of the main parties:

 Note: Campaign expenses were capped at BGN 2 million.

See also 
 2007 European Parliament election in Bulgaria
 2009 European Parliament election in Bulgaria
 2014 European Parliament election
 European Parliament elections, Bulgaria

References 

Bulgaria
European Parliament elections in Bulgaria
2014 elections in Bulgaria